The Tehoni-class (テホニ) locomotives were a class of steam tender locomotives of the Chosen Government Railway (Sentetsu) with 4-6-0 wheel arrangement. The "Teho" name came from the American naming system for steam locomotives, under which locomotives with 4-6-0 wheel arrangement were called "Ten Wheeler".

After the Liberation of Korea, of the 178 surviving locomotives of all Teho classes - including six previously owned by private railway companies - 106 went to the Korean National Railroad in the South, and 72 to the Korean State Railway in the North.

Description
The テホニ (Tehoni) class was a class of single-cylinder 4-6-0 locomotives for mainline use built by the Baldwin Locomotive Works and the Brooks Locomotive Works of the United States between 1906 and 1909, originally for the Gyeongbu Railway, and later operated by the Chosen Government Railway.

Gyeongbu Railway 200 series
Needing more locomotives for medium-duty passenger operations on both main and branchlines, the Gyeongbu Railway once again turned to Baldwin of the United States, ordering a total of twelve 4-6-0 tender locomotives in 1906. Six of these were six were single-cylinder locomotives and the other six were two-cylinder Vauclain compounds which were delivered in knockdown form and assembled at the railway's shops in Busan. Numbered 201–206, they were not long in operation with the Gyeongbu Railway, as the company was nationalised in July 1906 and folded into the newly formed National Railway, which became Sentetsu in 1910, in September of that year.

Chosen Government Railway テホニ (Tehoni) class
After being taken over by Sentetsu, another nine were delivered from Baldwin in 1908, followed by a further six from Brooks in 1909. They were put to use on mainline passenger trains, but as more powerful types were introduced, they were gradually relegated to branchline duties and freight trains. In 1918 they were renumbered 611–631, and between 1930 and 1935 they were rebuilt with superheaters. In Sentetsu's general renumbering of 1938, they were designated テホニ (Tehoni) class and numbered テホニ1 through テホニ21. This design became the basic pattern followed by subsequent Teho classes.

Postwar

Korean National Railroad 터우2 (Teou2) class
The exact dispersal of the twenty-one Tehosa-class locomotives after the partition of Korea in 1945 and the division of Sentetsu assets in 1947 is uncertain, but at least nine went to the South, where the Korean National Railroad designated them 터우2 (Teou2) class. They were used by the KNR primarily on local passenger trains and commuter trains.

Korean State Railway 더우두 (Tŏudu) class
Those that went to the North were designated 더우두 (Tŏudu) class by the Korean State Railway, but little is known of their service lives and subsequent fates.

Construction

References

Locomotives of Korea
Locomotives of South Korea
Locomotives of North Korea
Railway locomotives introduced in 1906
4-6-0 locomotives
Baldwin locomotives
Brooks locomotives